Maplesville is a town in Chilton County, Alabama, United States. At the 2020 census, the population was 637. It is located approximately halfway between Tuscaloosa and Montgomery on U.S. Route 82.

The mayor of Maplesville is W. C. Hayes, Jr.

History 

European settlers migrated to the area from Georgia and the Carolinas following the Battle of Horseshoe Bend in 1814, after the Native Americans who had been living there were defeated. The town was named after Stephen W. Maples, a merchant and the town's first postmaster.

The town was located at the crossroads of two important trading routes: the Elyton Road from Selma to Birmingham, and the Fort Jackson Road from Tuscaloosa to Montgomery. By 1850, the original town of Maplesville had a population of 809. The town had two horse-racing tracks, which brought visitors to the town, and had several inns and taverns to accommodate the stagecoach traffic.

The original town site began to decline in the early 1850s, after two railway lines were completed 3 miles west of the town. The  Alabama & Tennessee River Railway was constructed through in 1853. That same year, a depot was constructed at that location. Residents and businesspeople from the original Maplesville began moving closer to the railroad, and when the Maplesville Post Office was relocated to the railroad town in 1856, the new town was renamed Maplesville. The original town site gradually became deserted, and all that remains today is the Old Maplesville Cemetery along Highway 191. The Old Maplesville Cemetery contains many of the town's original inhabitants. This cemetery is also home to the oldest grave in Chilton County, dating back to 1833. However, the cemetery is just a fraction of its former size. Today, roughly 50 of the original tombstones remain. During the construction of Highway 191, several of the graves were destroyed during the process.

Because of Maplesville's abundant rail access, it became a shipping point for cotton and other goods from the surrounding area. In 1865, the train depot was destroyed in a raid by Union general James H. Wilson, as Wilson's Raiders marched on to Selma. It was replaced soon after the Civil War, but was destroyed by fire in 1911.

Maplesville continued to prosper after the Mobile and Ohio Railroad ran a line through the town in 1897, and many of the historic buildings in the town today were built during that period. In 1901, a lumber mill opened near the town, and the town's population grew as people moved to Maplesville to work at the mill. Maplesville incorporated in 1914, but the incorporation soon lapsed because the town failed to hold elections after the initial round. It reincorporated in 1947, and by 1951 had established a telephone system, garbage pick-up, and water system.

A new town hall was completed in 1975.

There are four historic sites currently recognized in Maplesville.  The Walker-Klinner Farm is listed on the National Register of Historic Places, and the following three locations are listed on the Alabama Register of Landmarks and Heritage:
 Maplesville Depot (circa 1912; listed November 23, 1976).
 Maplesville Methodist Episcopal Church (circa 1870–1890; listed December 4, 1992).
 Maplesville Railroad Historic District (19th–20th century; listed September 26, 2003).

Geography
Maplesville is located in southwestern Chilton County at 32°46'54.800" North, 86°52'31.861" West (32.781889, -86.875517). It is located along U.S. Route 82, which runs northwest to southeast on the south side of town. Tuscaloosa is 55 mi (89 km) to the northwest, and Montgomery is 49 mi (79 km) to the southeast, both via US-82. Alabama State Route 22 runs west to east through the center of town, leading east 15 mi (24 km) to Clanton, the Chilton County seat, and southwest 29 mi (47 km) to Selma.

Demographics

2020 census

As of the 2020 United States census, there were 637 people, 246 households, and 163 families residing in the town.

2007
As of the census of 2007, there were 2500 people, 268 households, and 183 families residing in the town. The racial makeup of the town was 69.94% White, 29.61% Black or African American and 0.45% Native American. 0.89% of the population were Hispanic or Latino of any race.

There were 268 households, out of which 32.8% had children under the age of 18 living with them, 52.2% were married couples living together, 11.9% had a female householder with no husband present, and 31.7% were non-families. 30.2% of all households were made up of individuals, and 12.7% had someone living alone who was 65 years of age or older. The average household size was 2.51 and the average family size was 3.13.

In the town, the population was spread out, with 25.3% under the age of 18, 10.1% from 18 to 24, 26.9% from 25 to 44, 23.5% from 45 to 64, and 14.1% who were 65 years of age or older. The median age was 37 years. For every 100 females, there were 95.9 males. For every 100 females age 18 and over, there were 88.0 males.

The median income for a household in the town was $27,500, and the median income for a family was $36,250. Males had a median income of $31,042 versus $22,361 for females. The per capita income for the town was $12,777. About 12.6% of families and 20.1% of the population were below the poverty line, including 26.7% of those under age 18 and 16.0% of those age 65 or over.

Local attractions

Attractions 
 Noah's Motorcross Park
 Perry Mountain Motorcycle Club
 L & M Auctions & Appraisals
 Minooka Park
 Snake Pit Racing
 Norman Smith Pottery
 Numerous scenic walking trails

Places of worship 
 Maplesville Baptist Church
 Maplesville United Methodist Church
 Pilgrim Rest Baptist Church
 Happy Church, Inc./Christian Life Church Learning Center

Historic cemeteries 
 Goodwin Family Cemetery
 Atchison Family Cemetery
Abney Family Cemetery 
Old Maplesville Cemetery

Historic buildings 
 Walker-Klinner Farm
 Maplesville Depot
 Maplesville Methodist Church
 Maplesville Railroad Historic District
 Ebenezer Baptist Church

Notable people
Tommie Agee, former Auburn and NFL player
Randall Atcheson, classical pianist
Harold Morrow, former Auburn and NFL fullback
James "Anthony" Sullivan, Stillman College, Public Servant, Politics (Birmingham AL)|neighborhood president, Birmingham Board of Education

Gallery

References

External links

Town of Maplesville official website

Towns in Alabama
Towns in Chilton County, Alabama
Birmingham metropolitan area, Alabama